Following the Stonewall riots and the birth of the modern gay rights movement in 1969, gay activists began challenging the way American television episodes with LGBT themes presented homosexuality. With the slowly increasing visibility of LGBT characters on fiction series, a pattern began to emerge, beginning with repressed lesbian sniper Miss Brant from 1961's The Asphalt Jungle and continuing through a murderous female impersonator from The Streets of San Francisco and Police Woman and her trio of killer lesbians in 1974 and beyond, of presenting LGBT characters as psychotic killers on crime dramas. On medical dramas, the disease model of homosexuality was fostered in characters like 1963's Hallie Lambert from The Eleventh Hour and Martin Loring from Marcus Welby, M.D. in 1973. Gays, the viewing public was told over and over, were simultaneously dangerous and sick, to be feared and to be pitied.

In response to complaints about several early portrayals, networks began vetting scripts with gay characters or content through two recently formed advocacy groups, the National Gay Task Force and the Gay Media Task Force. Several episodes saw substantive changes based on these consultations, but in other instances, notably the Marcus Welby, M.D. episode "The Other Martin Loring", only minor changes were made and groups like the Gay Activists Alliance led zaps, raucous demonstrations, against the networks. Protests against the 1974 Marcus Welby episode "The Outrage", with its male child molestation plot, and the aforementioned killer lesbian trio from the Police Woman episode "Flowers of Evil" led producers to start moving away from the killer queer plot device. Gays and lesbians would continue to be portrayed as killers but their motives would less frequently be related to their sexuality. Gays started killing out of greed and jealousy, just like heterosexuals. Other dramas not legal or medical in nature also ran occasional episodes featuring LGBT characters.

Sitcoms too began presenting LGBT characters, with All in the Family producing several episodes on the theme beginning in 1971. Gay sitcom episodes tended to follow one of a handful of plot devices: a character close to a lead character would unexpectedly come out, forcing the characters to confront their own issues with homosexuality; a lead character is mistaken for gay; a lead character pretends to be gay (a recurring theme in Three's Company, where Jack Tripper (John Ritter) has to pretend to be gay so that his landlord(s) would allow him to live with two single female roommates); or, more rarely, a recurring character from the series comes out. In the first instance, it was rare that the gay character would ever make another appearance. Dating back to Robert Reed's turn as a transgender doctor on Medical Center in 1975, transgender characters and issues have tended to receive sympathetic treatment.

This list covers American television episodes with LGBT themes that aired from 1970 through 1979.

Episodes

See also
 List of 1980s American television episodes with LGBT themes
 List of 1990s American television episodes with LGBT themes
 List of made-for-television films with LGBT characters
 List of pre-Stonewall American television episodes with LGBT themes
 Lists of television programs with LGBT characters

Notes

References

Episodes with LGBT themes
American television episodes with LGBT themes, 1970s
Television episodes, 1970s
LGBT themes, 1970s
American television episodes, 1970s
1970s LGBT-related mass media
LGBT themes in fiction